Opera Hall Block may refer to:

Opera Hall Block (King City, Missouri), listed on the National Register of Historic Places in Gentry County, Missouri
Opera Hall Block (Hudson, Wisconsin), listed on the National Register of Historic Places in St. Croix County, Wisconsin